Sweet Dreams (Are Made of This) is the second studio album by British pop duo Eurythmics, released on 4 January 1983 by RCA Records.

Background and release

Release and popularity
After a year and a half of initial commercial failure for Eurythmics, this album became a breakthrough for the duo on both sides of the Atlantic. The title track became particularly popular and remains one of Eurythmics' most recognisable songs. Its music video, popular on MTV in the United States, is memorable for Annie Lennox's gender-bending imagery. In the wake of this success, the single "Love Is a Stranger", previously a flop, was re-released and became a hit as well. It too was accompanied by a striking video that featured Lennox dressed both as a man and a woman.

The album was re-released in 2005 with the entire Eurythmics studio catalogue except the 1984 (For the Love of Big Brother) album, to which Virgin Records holds the rights. The recordings were remastered and several bonus tracks added to each of eight albums. In this release, Sweet Dreams (Are Made of This) acquired six bonus tracks.

Releases
Early Australian, German, and US CD releases (printed in Japan) and the 2005 reissue version of this album have a slightly longer version of "This City Never Sleeps". The length of 6:40 is due to some mixed sound effects and a backmasked message by David A. Stewart saying, "I enjoyed making that there record. Very good, very good" that total 21 seconds. This message also appears on original UK vinyl pressings.

During 1982, Eurythmics recorded many tracks that ended up as B-sides of singles or as alternative versions of other songs. Tracks such as "Step on the Beast", "Invisible Hands", "Dr. Trash", or the alternative versions of "The Walk" have not been released on CD yet and any future plans for re-release are unknown at this time. However, these tracks can now be heard through YouTube.

Critical reception

Sweet Dreams (Are Made of This) was included in the book 1001 Albums You Must Hear Before You Die.

Track listing

Personnel
Credits adapted from the liner notes of Sweet Dreams (Are Made of This).
 David A. Stewart – production ; engineering
 Adam Williams – production ; engineering
 Robert Crash – production ; engineering
 Chris Ashbrook – video stills
 Lewis Ziolek – cover photography
 Laurence Stevens – design
 Green Gartside – guest vocals

Sweet Dreams: The Video Album

Eurythmics also released a video album for Sweet Dreams (Are Made of This), featuring in-concert performances, promotional videos, and narrative animation highlighting the duo's singles "Sweet Dreams (Are Made of This)", "Love Is a Stranger", and other songs from the album.

The live concert performances, taped at the Heaven nightclub in London, feature a selection of songs from Sweet Dreams (Are Made of This), as well as two songs from their 1981 debut album, In the Garden, "Never Gonna Cry Again" and "Take Me to Your Heart".

The video album was directed by Derek Burbidge, with the exception of the promos for "Love Is a Stranger" (directed by Mike Brady), "Who's That Girl?" (directed by Duncan Gibbins), and "Sweet Dreams (Are Made of This)" (directed by Chris Ashbrook).

Information
 Director: Derek Burbidge
 Producers: Kate Burbidge, Maurice Bacon
 Executive producer: Mickey Shapiro
 Animation: Bura and Hardwick Animation
 VHS release: 1983
 DVD release: 1998

Track listing
 "Prologue" (introduction montage) – 1:46
 "This Is the House" (live version) – 4:48
 "Never Gonna Cry Again" (live version) – 4:21
 "Take Me to Your Heart" (live version) – 4:08
 "I've Got an Angel" (live version) – 3:41
 "Satellite of Love" (live version) – 5:01
 "Love Is a Stranger" (promo) – 3:26
 "Who's That Girl?" (promo) – 3:40
 "This City Never Sleeps" (live version) – 5:12
 "Jennifer" (live version) – 4:39
 "Sweet Dreams (Are Made of This)" (live version) – 3:36
 "I Could Give You (A Mirror)" (live version) – 3:47
 "Somebody Told Me" (live version) – 3:25
 "Wrap It Up" (live version) – 3:20
 "Tous les garçons et les filles" (live version) – 3:40
 "Sweet Dreams (Are Made of This)" (promo) – 3:40

Charts

Weekly charts

Year-end charts

Certifications

References

External links

 Sweet Dreams (Are Made of This) (Adobe Flash) at Radio3Net (streamed copy where licensed)

1983 albums
1983 video albums
Albums produced by David A. Stewart
Albums recorded in a home studio
Albums recorded at The Church Studios
Bertelsmann Music Group video albums
Eurythmics albums
Eurythmics video albums
Live video albums
RCA Records albums